Sylvia (minor planet designation: 87 Sylvia) is the one of the largest asteroids (approximately tied for 7th place, to within measurement uncertainties). It is the parent body of the Sylvia family and member of Cybele group located beyond the main asteroid belt (see minor-planet groups). Sylvia was the first asteroid known to possess more than one moon.

Discovery and naming
Sylvia was discovered by N. R. Pogson on May 16, 1866, from Madras (Chennai), India. Antonio Paluzie-Borrell, writing in Paul Herget's The Names of the Minor Planets (1955), mistakenly states that the name honors Sylvie Petiaux-Hugo Flammarion, the first wife of astronomer Camille Flammarion. In fact, in the article announcing the discovery of the asteroid, Pogson explained that he selected the name in reference to Rhea Silvia, mother of Romulus and Remus (MNRAS, 1866).

Physical characteristics
Sylvia is very dark in color and probably has a primitive composition, though with some internal differentiation. The discovery of its moons made possible an accurate measurement of the asteroid's mass, density and mass distribution. Its density is low (around 1.4 times the density of water), indicating that the asteroid is porous; best-fit models estimate it had an original composition by volume of 35% rock, 13% ice and 52% internal voids, and that today it consists of a pristine anhydrous outer layer, and a differentiated interior, with meltwater having percolated inward so that the porosity of the rock is filled with ice out to a radius of about 46 km, then ice-free porous rock out to about 104 km. 

Sylvia is a fairly fast rotator, turning about its axis every 5.2 hours, giving it an equatorial rotation velocity of about 65 m/s, almost half the escape velocity. 

Sylvia's shape is flattened and elongated (a/b ≈ 1.45 ; a/c ≈ 1.84) and somewhat irregular. However, its surface has not been imaged well enough for individual features to be resolved.

Satellite system

Sylvia has two orbiting satellites. They have been named (87) Sylvia I Romulus and (87) Sylvia II Remus, after Romulus and Remus, the children of the mythological Rhea Silvia.

Romulus, the first moon, was discovered on February 18, 2001, from the Keck II telescope by Michael E. Brown and Jean-Luc Margot. Remus, the second moon, was discovered over three years later on August 9, 2004, by Franck Marchis of UC Berkeley, and Pascal Descamps, Daniel Hestroffer, and Jérôme Berthier of the Observatoire de Paris, France.

The orbital properties of the satellites are listed in this table. The orbital planes of both satellites and the equatorial plane of the primary asteroid are all well-aligned. Diameters are estimates based on the assumption that the moons have the same albedo as their primary.

References

External links 
 Pogson, N. R. (1866), Minor Planet (87) Sylvia, Monthly Notices of the Royal Astronomical Society, Vol. 26, p. 311 (June 1866)
 Data on (87) Sylvia from Johnston's archive (maintained by W. R. Johnston)
 Rubble-Pile Minor Planet Sylvia and Her Twins (ESO news release, August 2005) Includes images and artists impressions
 Adaptive Optics System Reveals New Asteroidal Satellite (SpaceDaily.com, March 2001) Includes a discovery image.
 Space.com: First asteroid trio discovered
 IAUC 7588, reporting discovery of S/2001 (87) 1
 IAUC 7590, confirming the discovery
 IAUC 8582, reporting discovery of S/2004 (87) 1 and naming Romulus and Remus
 An animation of (87) Sylvia and its moons (on Vimeo)
 Shape model derived from lightcurve (on page 19)
 Instability zones for satellites of asteroids. The example of the (87) Sylvia system (arXiv:1112.5363 / 22 December 2011)
 Orbits, masses, and evolution of main belt triple (87) Sylvia (arXiv:1206.5755 / 25 Jun 2012)
 Occultation of TYC 1856-00745-1 by (87) Sylvia and by its satellite Romulus  (E. Frappa, A. Klotz, P. Dubreuil)
 
 

 
000087
000087
Discoveries by N. R. Pogson
Named minor planets
000087
000087
000087
18660516